Chris Ashley is an artist who creates his work through the use of coding with simple instruction to create shapes, add colors and texture to his paintings. Through the use of this new medium, he is able to create freedoms and use this freedom to diffuse and inject his artwork with new fresh meaning. His style is productive but his behavior is strongly expressionist.

“Transparencies 2007” is a two-image work of art where Ashley displays the ability to use contrast to convey meaning.  In “Cinematic Dataculture”, the shape of a cake, the blue and soft pink layer floats between two areas of the acrylic.  The manner the blue color is applied gives it dimensions to curl throughout the structure.  The leading purpose was to differentiate the horizontal edges of the four layers cake.  The vertical pink bar drew the eye across the structure and it rounded out towards the durable edges.  Because of its deliberate pixilation, this piece is assumed to have been man made.  The geometrical piece is breathtaking, full of meaning, and well thought out.

References
 Profile on Rhizome.org
 Chris Ashley's official site
 http://artnews.org
 Review of his 2007-08 show "I Made This for You" at KQED Arts

Living people
American digital artists
Year of birth missing (living people)
Place of birth missing (living people)